Knockout Cup (sometimes referred to as the KO Cup) is a type of British motorcycle speedway competition, examples of which have run annually since 1929.

Each tier of British Speedway has its own respective Knockout Cup. The current Knockout Cup competitions are the SGB Premiership Knockout Cup (tier one), the SGB Championship Knockout Cup (tier two) and the National League Knockout Cup (tier three).

The cups have been run in the past under the associated name of the League at the time. For example Elite League Knockout Cup when tier one was the Elite League, a Premier League Knockout Cup when tier two was the Premier League and so on.

Knockout Cups (chronological order)

Tier One
National Trophy 1931–1964
British League Knockout Cup 1965–1967
British League Division One Knockout Cup 1968–1974
British League Knockout Cup 1975–1994
Premier League Knockout Cup 1995–1996
Elite League Knockout Cup 1997–2012
 not held, 2012-2016
SGB Premiership Knockout Cup 2017–2019
 not held, 2020-2022

Tier Two
National Trophy (provincial final) 1936–1937
National Trophy (qualifying final) 1938–1956
Provincial League KO Cup 1960–1964
British League Division Two Knockout Cup 1968–1974
New National League Knockout Cup 1975–1976
National League Knockout Cup 1977–1990
British League Division Two Knockout Cup 1991–1994
Academy League Knockout Cup 1995
Conference League Knockout Cup 1996
Premier League Knockout Cup 1997–2016
SGB Championship Knockout Cup 2017–present

Tier Three
National Trophy (qualifying final) 1948–1952
Conference League Knockout Cup 1998–2008
National League Knockout Cup 2009–present

List of Winners

Shared title*

Most Tier One Knockout Cups

References

Speedway competitions in the United Kingdom